András Révész (born Galgóc, now Hlohovec, Slovakia; 1896–1970), known also as Andrés Révész Speier, was a Hungarian biographer, journalist, and writer.

References
BOTKA FERENC: MALLORCAI „SZÉP NAPOK" (Déry Tibor két élete, 1934-1936-ban írt naplójegyzetei tükrében) 

Hungarian journalists
Hungarian translators
20th-century translators
Hungarian biographers
Male biographers
1896 births
1970 deaths
People from Hlohovec
20th-century Hungarian male writers
20th-century journalists
20th-century biographers